Our World was the first live multinational multi-satellite television production. National broadcasters from fourteen countries around the world, coordinated by the European Broadcasting Union (EBU), participated in the program. The two-hour event, which was broadcast on Sunday 25 June 1967 in twenty-four countries, had an estimated audience of 400 to 700 million people, the largest television audience up to that date. Four communications satellites were used to provide a worldwide coverage, which was a technological milestone in television broadcasting.

Creative artists, including opera singer Heather Harper, film director Franco Zeffirelli, conductor Leonard Bernstein, sculptor Alexander Calder and painter Joan Miró were invited to perform or appear in separate live segments, each of them produced by one of the participant broadcasters. The most famous segment is one from the United Kingdom starring the Beatles performing their song "All You Need Is Love" for the first time.

Planning 

The project was conceived by British Broadcasting Corporation (BBC) producer Aubrey Singer. Due to the magnitude of the production, its coordination was transferred to the European Broadcasting Union (EBU), with Singer as the project's head. Two communications satellites in geosynchronous orbit over the Atlantic Ocean – Intelsat I (known as "Early Bird") and Intelsat II F-3 ("Canary Bird") –, two over the Pacific Ocean – Intelsat II F-2 ("Lani Bird") and NASA's ATS-1 – and nine ground stations, in addition to EBU's Eurovision point-to-point communications network, all monitored by technical and production teams in forty-three control rooms, were used to link North America, Europe, Tunisia, Japan and Australia in real time.

The master control room for the broadcast was the TC1 studio control room at the BBC Television Centre in London. Contributions from North America, Japan and Australia were routed to London by the CBS Switching Center in New York (which was rented for the purpose), and contributions from continental Europe and Tunisia were routed to London by the EBU Centre in Brussels. These centers were also in charge of distributing the live master feed from London to the broadcasters in their assigned area. To illustrate the introductory segments, a large set was built at BBC's TC1 studio, which was operated by the TC2 studio control room. To solve language issues, each receiving broadcaster had its own narrator – such as Cliff Michelmore in the BBC or James Dibble in the ABC – reading in its own language the script written by Antony Jay. Since the contributions from the participating broadcasters were in their native language, a team of interpreters located at BBC's TC2 studio provided simultaneous translation into English, French and German to the receiving broadcasters, where local commentators voiced-over in their own language the original sound from other broadcasters when in other language.

It took ten months and ten thousand technicians, producers and performers to bring everything together. The ground rules included that no politicians or heads of state could participate in the broadcast. In addition, everything had to be "live", so no use of videotape or film was permitted, all participants had to have full knowledge of what was going to be included and the sole reason for including an item would be program balance, not geographical or political concerns.

In the dress rehearsal conducted the day before broadcast, the head of the production noticed that, in violation of one of the ground rules, the Mexican broadcaster had pre-recorded their main segment – which included singers, dancers and a flock of white doves taking off right on cue – and attempted to pass it off as live. As getting it together again for the actual broadcast was impossible, it was decided to show them – live – watching their taped performance on monitors.

Participants 
Fourteen national broadcasters participated in the program, which was transmitted live to twenty-four countries, with an estimated audience between 400 and 700 million people. Eighteen national broadcasters were intended to participate, but those of the Eastern Bloc countries – Czechoslovakia, East Germany, Hungary, Poland and the Soviet Union –, pulled out four days before the broadcast in protest of the Western nations' response to the Six-Day War. Due to this withdrawal, a request was made to the Danish broadcaster, which was not originally a participant, for a contribution.

Broadcast 
Each broadcaster had an explanatory pre-transmission introduction from their studios to their viewers – such as the introduction by Cliff Michelmore at BBC's TC5 studio in London for BBC1, the one by James Dibble at ABC's studio 23 in Sydney for ABC-TV and the interview to philosopher Marshall McLuhan at the television control room in Toronto for CBC Television – just before connecting to the live master feed from London at 7:00 p.m. GMT.

The program was divided into six sections: the Opening, This Moment's World, The Crowded World, Aspiration to Physical Excellence, Aspiration to Artistic Excellence and The World Beyond. These sections were divided into live segments provided by the participating broadcasters. Just before The Crowded World section, another section was scheduled – The Hungry World –, but due to the withdrawal of the Eastern Bloc countries' segments, that section was eventually removed and its remaining segments were incorporated into The Crowded World section.

Opening 
The opening credits were accompanied by the "Our World theme" played by the Vienna Philharmonic and sung in seventeen different languages by the Vienna Boys' Choir.

The program began with an introduction from the BBC's TC1 studio in London and went on attending the births of four children in the delivery rooms at Hokkaido University Hospital in Sapporo, Japan, at Aarhus University Hospital in Aarhus, Denmark, at Hospital de Obstetricia III in Mexico City, Mexico – reported by Pedro Ferriz – and at Charles Camsell Hospital in Edmonton, Canada – reported by Libbie Christensen –.

This Moment's World 
Back in BBC's TC1 studio in London, a journey around the world was introduced starting at the United Austrian Iron and Steelworks in Linz, Austria, and continuing aboard a Protection Civile helicopter flying over the returning weekend traffic at Porte de la Chapelle in Paris, France – reported by Joseph Pasteur –, at the Medina in Tunis, Tunisia and aboard some fishing vessels sailing in the Gulf of Cádiz, Spain, showing the work of the fishermen and praising the country's fishing industry.

At 7:17 p.m. GMT, the show switched to Glassboro, New Jersey, in the United States – at 3:17 p.m. EDT –, where a summit conference between American president Lyndon Johnson and Soviet premier Alexei Kosygin was taking place – reported by Dick McCutcheon, who ended up talking about the impact of the new television technology on a global scale; and since no politician should be shown, only the exterior of the house where the conference was being held was televised –. At 7:18 p.m. GMT it switched back to Canada, to Two Rivers Ranch in Ghost Lake, Alberta, showing a rancher, and his cutting horse, cutting out a herd of cattle – reported by Bob Switzer –, and at 7:19 p.m. GMT to Kitsilano Beach, in Vancouver's Point Grey – at 12:19 p.m. PDT –.

At 7:20 p.m. GMT, the program shifted continents to Asia, with Tokyo, Japan – at 4:20 a.m. JST next day – being the next segment showing the construction of the Tokyo subway system. The equator was crossed for the first time in the program  when it switched to Australia – at 5:22 a.m. AEST –. This was the most technically complicated point in the broadcast, as both Japanese and Australian satellite ground stations had to reverse their actions: Kashima Ground Station in Japan had to go from transmit mode to receive mode, while Cooby Creek Tracking Station in Australia had to switch from receive to transmit mode. The segment from Melbourne dealt with trams leaving the South Melbourne tram depot – reported by Brian King explaining that sunrise was many hours away as it was winter there –.

The Crowded World 
Back in BBC's TC1 studio in London, a section about human overpopulation was introduced starting at the Controlled Environment Research Laboratory (CERES), the Commonwealth Scientific and Industrial Research Organisation (CSIRO)'s phytotron in Canberra, Australia, featuring plant physiologist Lloyd Evans who was carrying out experiments to extend the frequency of cereal crop cycles – reported by Eric Hunter – and continuing at New York City, at Ikushima shrimp farm in Takamatsu, Japan, at a farm in Wisconsin, United States, at Habitat 67 housing complex in the International and Universal Exposition in Montreal, Canada and finishing at Cumbernauld, Scotland – reported by Magnus Magnusson –.

Aspiration to Physical Excellence 
Back in BBC's TC1 studio in London, a section about men and women trying to achieve their best was introduced starting at Empire Pool in Vancouver, Canada, featuring swimmer Elaine Tanner trying to break the 110-yard butterfly World Record – reported by Ted Reynolds –, and continuing at the Equestrian Circle in Castellazzo di Bollate, Italy, featuring riders Piero D'Inzeo and Raimondo D'Inzeo – reported by Alberto Giubilo –, at Söderfors, Sweden, featuring canoeists Gert Fredriksson, Gunnar Utterberg, Lars Andersson and Rolf Pettersson and finishing at Calanque de Callelongue in Marseille, France aboard the maiden voyage of the Téléscaphe, the very first underwater cable car.

Aspiration to Artistic Excellence 
Back in BBC's TC1 studio in London, a section about men and women in pursuit of art was introduced starting at San Pietro church in Tuscania, Italy for the rehearsals of the film Romeo and Juliet, featuring film director Franco Zeffirelli and actors Milo O'Shea,  Leonard Whiting and Olivia Hussey and continuing at Bayreuth Festspielhaus in Bayreuth, West Germany, for the Bayreuth Festival rehearsals of the opera Lohengrin featuring director Wolfgang Wagner, conductor Rudolf Kempe and singers Heather Harper and Grace Hoffman, at Fondation Maeght in Saint-Paul-de-Vence, France featuring sculptor Alexander Calder and painter Joan Miró, at Mexico City, Mexico featuring singers Antonio Aguilar singing "Allá en el Rancho Grande" on horseback and Flor Silvestre singing "Como México no hay dos" – reported by León Michel –, at the Lincoln Center in New York City featuring conductor Leonard Bernstein and pianist Van Cliburn rehearsing Rachmaninoff's Piano Concerto No. 3, and finishing at EMI Recording Studio 1 in Abbey Road, London, for the first recording session of "All You Need Is Love" by the Beatles – reported by Steve Race –.

The World Beyond 
Back in BBC's TC1 studio in London, a section about outer space was introduced starting at Kennedy Space Center at Cape Kennedy in the United States, continuing at Parkes Observatory in Parkes, Australia, featuring John Gatenby Bolton tracking quasar 0237–23, the most distant known object in the universe at the time – reported by Kim Corcoran – and finishing back in BBC's TC1 studio in London for a closing segment intercutting live footage from several of the locations already shown.

Legacy

The Beatles' segment 

As the broadcast took place at the height of the Vietnam War, the Beatles were asked to write a song with a positive message. They topped the event with their debut performance of "All You Need Is Love". They invited many of their friends to the event to create a festive atmosphere and to join in on the song's chorus. Among the friends were members of the Rolling Stones, Eric Clapton, Marianne Faithfull, Keith Moon and Graham Nash.

Although Our World was originally recorded and transmitted in black-and-white, for its use in the 1995 TV special The Beatles Anthology, the Beatles' performance on the program was colourised, using colour photographs taken at the event as a reference. The sequence opens in its original monochromatic format and rapidly morphs into full colour, conveying the brightly coloured flower power and psychedelic-style clothing worn by the Beatles and their guests that was popular during what was subsequently dubbed the "Summer of Love".

In Literature 
In the 2000 novel The Light of Other Days by Arthur C. Clarke and Stephen Baxter, the global media empire run by Hiram Patterson is called OurWorld, the name chosen after the character saw the program as a child and was inspired to change the world.

See also
 List of the Beatles' live performances

Notes

References

External links 
 
 
 
 Our World - NHK Sōgō Terebijon introduction (in Japanese)

1967 television specials
International broadcasting
International telecommunications
Television programmes about the Beatles
Simulcasts